In coding theory, the weight enumerator polynomial of a binary linear code specifies the number of words of each possible  Hamming weight.

Let  be a binary linear code length .  The weight distribution is the sequence of numbers

giving the number of codewords c in C having weight t as t ranges from 0 to n.  The weight enumerator is the bivariate polynomial

Basic properties

MacWilliams identity

(where  denotes the vector dot product and which is taken over ).

The MacWilliams identity states that

The identity is named after Jessie MacWilliams.

Distance enumerator
The distance distribution or inner distribution of a code C of size M and length n is the sequence of numbers

where i ranges from 0 to n.  The distance enumerator polynomial is

and when C is linear this is equal to the weight enumerator.

The outer distribution of C is the 2n-by-n+1 matrix B with rows indexed by elements of GF(2)n and columns indexed by integers 0...n, and entries

The sum of the rows of B is M times the inner distribution vector (A0,...,An).

A code C is regular if the rows of B corresponding to the codewords of C are all equal.

References
 
 
  Chapters 3.5 and 4.3.

Coding theory
Error detection and correction
Mathematical identities
Polynomials